Mondex was a smart card electronic cash system, implemented as a stored-value card, with e-wallets and owned by Mastercard.

Pioneered by two bankers from NatWest in 1990, it was spun-off to a separate consortium later on, then sold again to Mastercard.    

It was a forerunner in the 'cashless' society that is common today via mobile, e-wallets, and tokenization, but was far ahead of it's time.  

Mondex allowed users to use its electronic card as they would with cash, enabling peer-to-peer offline transfers between cards, which did not need any authorization, via Mondex ATMs, computer card readers, personal 'wallets' and specialized telephones. This offline nature of the system and other unique features made Mondex stand out from leading competitors at the time, such as Visa Cash, which was a closed system and was much closer in concept to a traditional payment cards' transactional operation.

Mondex also allowed for a full-card locking mechanism, usage with multiple currencies within a single card, and a certain degree of user anonymity. Mondex cards were at some point common place in many universities at a certain point as they were mostly trialed there, and were also issued as dual-application cards - like combo credit cards, ID cards, and loyalty membership cards.

The system was introduced around the world in more than a dozen nations, with various differing implementations. Despite continuous investment from MasterCard, the Mondex scheme did not seem to catch on worldwide and the last place where it operated, Taiwan, had its cards disabled in 31 May 2008, being succeeded by a similar but more technologically advanced system, named MasterCard Cash, which utilized contactless operation, culminating in the TaiwanMoney Card.

History
The Mondex scheme was invented in 1990 by Tim Jones and Graham Higgins of NatWest in the United Kingdom. In March 1992 internal tests of the system, known at the time as 'Byte', started running at one of NatWest's major computer centres, Goodman's Fields in London.

Until December 1993 development continued in secret, when the system was publicly unveiled with an announcement that the Midland Bank had joined the scheme as a 50/50 investment partner.

Initial public trials of the payment system were carried out from July 1995 in Swindon, Wiltshire. The public phase had required the development and manufacture of numerous merchant devices and smart cards, with BT, NatWest and the Midland Bank sponsoring and installing retail terminals at the car parks, payphones, buses and at merchants in the town, and issuing Mondex cards to residents. Within the first five weeks of the trial, 1,900 terminals had reportedly been installed at 620 retailers, and 6,000 cardholders had signed up, with a target of 40,000 cardholders and 1,000 vendors being pursued during the course of the one year trial. By September 1995, all buses, car parks and payphones were meant to accept Mondex, and 20 cashpoints and 300 payphones were meant to support funds transfers using the system.

In July 1996, NatWest and Midland Bank sold the intellectual property rights to develop the Mondex concept, technology, and brand to a new group called Mondex International, with 17 major banks joining the group as shareholders. From that point on, Mondex International managed the Mondex brand, oversaw its franchisees and signed contracts with new ones around the globe. It also managed the Mondex technology and developed its software.

In November that same year, Mastercard acquired 51% ownership of Mondex International and fully endorsed the Mondex scheme, promptly abandoning its own electronic cash system which had been in development up until then.
Mastercard then acquired full ownership of the company in June 2001.

In 1996 Visa and Mastercard agreed to what was known as the Upper West Side trial. Visa deployed Visa Cash, their own electronic cash scheme, and MasterCard deployed Mondex to see if the people on Manhattan Island would embrace the concept and the technology as a means of replacing cash.

Mondex launched in a number of markets during the 1990s, expanding from the original trial in Swindon to Hong Kong, New York and Guelph, Canada. It was also trialled on several British university campuses from the late 1990s, including the University of Edinburgh, University of Exeter (between 1997 and 2001), University of York, University of Nottingham, Aston University and Sheffield Hallam University.

Throughout the late 90s and early 2000s trials continued to be executed throughout the world, with varying degrees of customer adoption and popularity. At the end, even the more successful of these trials failed their purpose, as most of the countries which had Mondex pilots never saw a national implementation of the system - in many locations the scheme stayed in an experimental phase until the local Mondex franchisee shut its doors.

Operation
As a stored-value system, Mondex cards were designed as an electronic replacement for cash - they always held a certain value, allowing offline transactions to be possible without needing a line of credit or communication with the credit company, like with a traditional credit card. This way they were able to be offered to a sector that wasn't catered by traditional forms of electronic payment.

All value circulated between Mondex cards was issued by an 'originator' - in order to create Mondex value the originator (a part of the local Mondex franchise) would exchange cash with the Mondex partnering banks and provide them with an equal amount of Mondex electronic value, which could be later withdrawn by cardholders using the bank accounts associated to their cards.

Transfers, card top-up and payments & e-wallets
Mondex is an open-loop implementation of the electronic cash scheme - instead of transactions occurring only in one way, money can be transferred between any Mondex user via e-wallets.

A transfer of funds using the Mondex card (dubbed an 'electronic purse') operated through a Mondex-enabled device, and in principle occurred between 2 cards - whether it was 2 customers or a customer and a seller. 

Both would insert their cards into a device which would facilitate the transfer of funds and record the transaction onto the card.
The card's memory consisted of the last 10 transactions.

In order to top-up their cards, users could use an ATM, go to a bank branch, or visit several stores and businesses with compatible hardware.
Mondex cards that were issued by banks allowed cardholders to transfer funds to and from their personal bank account, which was linked directly to their card. 

Mondex cards could be used in any store or machine that supported it and had the necessary equipment. Depending on the country where the system was implemented, Mondex cards were accepted at a variety of businesses - supermarkets, department stores, public transport, taxis, car parks, vending machines, restaurants, cafés and many more. Some countries even allowed usage of the cards in lottery games.

International use
Mondex cards carried five 'electronic pockets', separate from one another, each containing money denominated in a different currency. This allowed transactions to be made using one of the 5 currencies loaded on the card. The currencies in the 'pockets' could be unloaded and replaced at any time.

Security features
Mondex cards included a locking mechanism - a PIN number would be chosen and inserted to lock the card, and before operating the card again (to view the latest transactions or transfer funds) the cardholder had to insert his PIN number and unlock it.

The Z notation was used to prove security properties about Mondex, allowing it to achieve ITSEC level E6, ITSEC's highest granted security-level classification.

Card types
In many countries the electronic purse was issued on a dual-application card, implementing two or more uses within a single card.

In some instances, the Mondex card was issued alongside a regular credit card, allowing transactions to be made either with money stored in the Mondex wallet or via the traditional credit card. 

Other dual application uses included a user card in a private health service - holding personal health records and other details in cases of emergency; and a club membership card, containing special discounts and benefits. Mondex was also used in numerous locations as an Employee/Student ID, and as a mass-transit electronic ticket scheme (to be used for buying a ticket or storing a ticket bought in advance).

Equipment
A number of devices allowed operation of Mondex cards (transferring value, viewing card balance, locking/unlocking cards, et cetera), to be used for either personal or commercial use:
 A balance reader - small keychain sized device that showed the current balance of a card. This device came with every Mondex card sold, so that customers could have an easy way to keep up with the balance loaded up on their card.
 An 'Electronic Wallet' - calculator-sized pocket device, allowing an individual to look at their card balance and recent transaction information, change PIN number and lock their card, and with a 2-slot wallet - transfer funds between cards.
 An IC card reader - a simple computer peripheral which allowed a cardholder to manage their card and make transactions through the internet. It was operated entirely through a computer, and enabled a similar feature set to the electronic wallet when using its companion software.
 A payphone, for use with a Mondex card as a form of payment; some payphones had similar functions to the handheld wallet, and could be used to make transfers and look at balance and transaction history, lock a card and change its PIN number. It was also possible to transfer money to and from the bank account linked to the card.
 A personal landline telephone, with 1 or 2 card slots, for transfers of funds between purses via the phone, or in person through the second card slot. Otherwise, it had a similar feature set to the payphone machines.
 A retailer terminal, housing the seller's card and another card slot for the customer's card, and containing a printer and a display. Intended for making transactions at stores as per any other purchase with a normal POS terminal - the customer's card would be inserted into the terminal and the appropriate funds would be transferred to the merchant's card inside. The terminal recorded the latest 300 transactions made with it.
 A 'Cashless ATM' - used like a normal ATM would be, with a Mondex card slot instead of cash withdrawal slot, had a similar feature set to the Mondex-enabled telephones, and like them allowed transfer of funds to and from an associated bank account.
 A 'Value-Box' - a cash-safe equivalent situated at a bank branch, containing large numbers of Mondex cards to facilitate any transfer made between customers and the bank.

Locations
Notes: The community trial launch date denominates a public trial of the Mondex scheme in that country, not the internal company trials that began prior. The commercial and trial shutdown dates indicate the point where fund withdrawals from the cards were disabled.

References

Financial services companies established in 1993
Payment systems
Formal methods
Z notation
Mastercard
NatWest Group
Stored-value payment card